Scorpaenopsis lactomaculata, the whiteblotched scorpionfish, is a species of venomous marine ray-finned fish belonging to the family Scorpaenidae, the scorpionfishes. This species is found in the Western Indian Ocean.

Size

References

lactomaculata
Taxa named by Albert William Herre
Fish described in 1945